Ruth Beckermann (born 1952, Vienna) is an Austrian filmmaker and writer.

Beckermann lives and works as an author and filmmaker in Vienna and Paris. Her films have been shown at prestigious festivals (most of them premiered at the Berlin International Film Festival or the Cinéma du Réel Festival in Paris). Her films Paper Bridge and East of War have won several major awards.

Life and career
Ruth Beckermann was born in Vienna, Austria in 1952. Her parents were Jewish survivors of the Holocaust.

Beckermann studied Journalism and Art History in Vienna and Tel Aviv, and received her doctorate in 1977. In New York she studied Photography at the School of Visual Arts. During her studies she worked as an editor for the magazines Weltwoche and Trend.

Her first film was made in cooperation with Josef Aichholzer and Franz Grafl of the Videogroup Arena in 1977. Shot on video and 16mm film, Arena Besetzt (Arena Squatted) documented the occupation of the old Viennese slaughterhouse Arena. The following year, Beckermann founded the film distribution company Filmladen along with Aichholzer and Grafl, where she continued working  until 1985.

In 1978 and 1981, filmed shot two documentaries, Suddenly A Strike and The Steelhammer Out there on The Grass on the topics of labour and strike. She also wrote her first books during that period of time.

In 1983, Beckermann released Return to Vienna, which documents the journeys and experiences of Franz West, a Jewish Social-Democrat living in Vienna during the First and Second World War. The film is the first of a trilogy, in which Beckermann deals with Jewish narratives of loss, memory and identity.  Following this film, Paper Bridge was released in 1987 and depicts a journey leading from Vienna to Romania, where Beckermann visits the Bukovina region, the birthplace of her father during a time when this region was still under Habsburg rule. In Towards Jerusalem Beckermann travels between Tel Aviv and Jerusalem while exploring the Zionist utopia of a Jewish homeland. These films - Return to Vienna, Paper Bridge and Towards Jerusalem use different forms of travel as both content and formal organizing principle.

In 1996, East of War was made during the so-called Wehrmachtsausstellung. In front of the out-of-focus-photographs, former soldiers of the German Wehrmacht talk about their experiences beyond the "normal" war. A film which not only pushes forward the destruction of the "good-Wehrmacht" myth, but also takes a close look at the process of constructing history in post-World War II Austria.

In her 1999 film, A Fleeting Passage to The Orient, she follows the traces of Elisabeth of Bavaria. In 2001, homemad(e) depicts how the political turn in 2000 was reflected in a Viennese coffee house.

Five years later, she followed four 12-year-olds on their journey to Bar Mitzva. was shown in festivals in Paris' (Cinema du Reel,), Vienna (Viennale 06) in Buenos Aires and Chicago and became a success with audiences.

In 2011, American Passages, premiered in the competition at the Cinéma du Réel.

Beckermann is a founding member of the Austrian Documentary and Filmmakers Society. A DVD collection of her films was released in 2007.

She taught at the University of Salzburg, the University of Illinois and at the University of Applied Arts Vienna.

Prizes 
 2000: Manés Serber Prize
 2015: Österreichisches Ehrenzeichen für Wissenschaft und Kunst (Austrian Decoration for Science and Art)
 2022: Encounters Award at the 72nd Berlin International Film Festival for Mutzenbacher

Filmography
 Mutzenbacher (2022)
 The Waldheim Waltz (2018)
 Those Who Go Those Who Stay (2013)
 Jackson/Marker 4AM' (2012)
 American Passages (2011)
 Zorros Bar Mizwa (2006)
 Homemad(e) (2000)
 Ein flüchtiger Zug nach dem Orient (1999) a.k.a. A Fleeting Passage to the Orient – International English title
 Jenseits des Krieges (1996) a.k.a. East of War – USA
 Nach Jerusalem (1991) a.k.a. Towards Jerusalem – International English title
 The Paper Bridge (1987)
 Return to Vienna (1983)
 Arena Squatted (1977)

Most of her feature-length films are available in the U.S.

Literature
 Alexander Horwath, Michael Omasta (Ed.): Ruth Beckermann, FilmmuseumSynemaPublikationen Vol. 29, Vienna: 2016, 
 Eszter Kondor, Michael Loebenstein (Ed.): Ruth Beckermann'', FilmmuseumSynemaPublikationen, Vienna: 2019,

References

External links
 Official website
 

Austrian women film directors
Austrian documentary film directors
English-language film directors
Austrian Jews
Film people from Vienna
1952 births
Living people
Academic staff of the University of Salzburg
Women documentary filmmakers